Gertrude Eliza Page (1872 – 1 April 1922) was an Anglo-Rhodesian novelist.

Biography
Educated at Bedford High School, Page wrote for The Girl's Own Paper as a teenager. Marrying George Alexander "Alec" Dobbin in 1902, she moved with him to Rhodesia, where she died in 1922.

Her best-selling book was Paddy the Next Best Thing, which was dramatized and performed in Britain at the Savoy Theatre. Another novel of hers, The Edge O' Beyond, of which more than 300,000 copies were sold, was also made into a play as well as being a 1919 film (directed by Fred W. Durrant, featuring Isobel Elsom, Owen Nares, Minna Grey, C. H. Hallard and Ruby Miller).

Selected bibliography
 Love in the Wilderness, 1907
 Paddy the Next Best Thing, 1908
 The Edge O' Beyond, 1908
 The Silent Rancher, 1909
 Two Lovers and a Lighthouse, 1910
 Where the Strange Roads Go Down, 1910
 Jill's Rhodesian Philosophy, or, The Dam Farm, 1910
 Winding Paths, 1911
 The Rhodesian, 1912
 The Great Splendour - 1912
 The Pathway, 1914
 Follow After, 1915
 Some There Are, 1916
 The Supreme Desire, 1916
 The Course of My Ship (with Foster-Melliar), 1918
 The Veldt Trail, 1919
 Far From the Limelight (and other tales), 1920
 Jill on a Ranch, 1922
 The Mysterious Strangers''

References

External links
 
 
 "Gertrude Page - 'The Kipling of Rhodesia'. The Woburn Sands Collection.
 Gertrude Page Bibliography with numerous images The Wade Burgess Collection

1872 births
1922 deaths
People from Erdington
British emigrants to Rhodesia
Rhodesian novelists
English women novelists
People from Birmingham, West Midlands
20th-century Zimbabwean writers
20th-century Zimbabwean women writers
20th-century English women
20th-century English people